Larry Lamb (born 1947) is an English actor and radio presenter.

Larry Lamb may also refer to:

 Larry Lamb (newspaper editor) (1929–2000), English newspaper editor for The Sun and Daily Express
 Larry the Lamb, character in Toytown

See also
 Lawrence Lambe (1863–1919), Canadian geologist and palaeontologist